Psevdas ( []) is a village in the Larnaca District of Cyprus, located 4 km east of Mosfiloti.

References

Communities in Larnaca District